Jedi Council: Acts of War is a 4-issue comics series, featuring several of the Jedi Masters, including Mace Windu, Qui-Gon Jinn, and Obi-Wan Kenobi. The comic is set less than a year before the Battle of Naboo in Star Wars: Episode I – The Phantom Menace, and 33 years before the Battle of Yavin in Star Wars Episode IV: A New Hope, telling the story of a Jedi task force sent to the Yinchorri system to settle a conflict.

Issues
Jedi Council: Acts of War 1
Jedi Council: Acts of War 2
Jedi Council: Acts of War 3
Jedi Council: Acts of War 4

Dramatis Personae
Adi Gallia
Darth Maul
Darth Sidious
Depa Billaba
Ebor Taulk
Eeth Koth
Even Piell
Finis Valorum
Jude Rozess
K'kruhk
Lilit Twoseas
Mace Windu
Micah Giett
Naeshahn
Obi-Wan Kenobi
Olmar Grahrk
Oppo Rancisis
Plo Koon
Qui-Gon Jinn
Saesee Tiin
Sei Taria
Soon Baytes
Tharence Wo
Theen Fida
Tieren Nie-Tan
Tsui Choi
Vilmarh Grahrk
Yaddle
Yarael Poof
Yoda

Collections
Jedi Council: Acts of War
Omnibus: Rise of the Sith

External links

Dark Horse Listing

Comics based on Star Wars